High Hollow, also known as the George Howe House, is a historic Chestnut Hill residence in Northwest Philadelphia designed and built by American architect George Howe.

Design
High Hollow's design is derived in-part from Howe's thesis while studying under Victor Laloux at the École des Beaux-Arts in France. Initial construction began in 1914, while Howe was apprenticed with the Philadelphia-based architecture firm Furness, Evans & Co., and was completed in 1917, during his time with Mellor Meigs & Howe.

The design is of European influence, particularly Italian and French, hinting at Howe's roots in the Beaux Arts, but it does not conform to any specific style of the time. Rather, High Hollow lends itself more to its surroundings then to any architectural genre. A local quarry was even reopened, just to supply the purplish stone used in its construction.

Bordering Fairmount Park and overlooking the Wissahickon Valley, High Hollow is often regarded as Howe's most significant residential work and viewed by many as setting the standard for house design in the region through the early 20th Century. Famed architect and educator Robert A. M. Stern referred to the house as being "often imitated" and "never surpassed" by those that came to design in a similar style.

Renowned American blacksmith Samuel Yellin, who was frequently commissioned by Mellor, Miegs & Howe, fabricated all of the intricate metalwork at the estate.

Other Occupants
When Howe left Mellor, Meigs & Howe in 1928, he sold High Hollow to cigar mogul Samuel Paley (see La Palina) and his artist-philanthropist wife, Goldie Paley. The Paleys were the parents of William Paley, who was instrumental in establishing the Columbia Broadcasting System (CBS) as the largest radio and television network in The United States. The Paleys lived at High Hollow for 20 years, after which they donated the property to the University of Pennsylvania, which in turn sold the property to a private owner. From 1995 to 2005 the home was owned by Drs. Martha and Lewis Little.  They attempted to keep the home as close to its original form as possible. 
The site was put on sheriff's auction in 2016.

See also
 Glenays - The addition (1925) and garden walls (1928) were designed by George Howe.

Notes

References
 
 
 
 

Houses completed in 1917
Houses in Philadelphia
Neo-Norman architecture in the United States
Chestnut Hill, Philadelphia